A Texas Funeral is a 1999 American fantasy comedy-drama film written and directed by William Blake Herron and starring Robert Patrick, Jane Adams and Martin Sheen.

Cast
 Quinton Jones as "Little Sparta"
 Robert Patrick as Zach
 Jane Adams as Mary Joan
 Martin Sheen as Grandpa Sparta
 Chris Noth as Clinton
 Olivia d'Abo as Charlotte
 Grace Zabriskie as Murtis
 Joanne Whalley as Miranda
 Isaiah Washington as Walter

References

External links
 
 

1990s fantasy comedy-drama films
American fantasy comedy-drama films
1990s English-language films
1990s American films